The Women's doubles event at the 2014 Commonwealth Games was held at the Scotstoun Sports Campus, Glasgow from 29 July to 2 August.

Dipika Pallikal and Joshna Chinappa of India defeated Laura Massaro and Jenny Duncalf of England 11–6, 11–8 to win the gold medal.

Medalists

Seeds

Finals

Group stage

Pool A

Pool B

Pool C

Pool D

External links
 http://results.glasgow2014.com/sports/sq/squash.html

Squash at the 2014 Commonwealth Games
Common